Egyptian 25th Brigade ambush was a battle that occurred on October 17, 1973, the eleventh day of the Yom Kippur War, east of the Great Bitter Lake, in the Sinai Peninsula. The ambush was conducted by the Israel Defense Forces' 162nd Division, against the 25th Brigade of the Egyptian army. The Israelis' goal was the destruction of the brigade, which attempted to disrupt the Israeli crossing of the Suez Canal.

Battle
After a string of counterattacks by Egyptian ground forces during the Israeli offensive in the Yom-Kippur War, Israeli Defense Forces were ambitious to put an end to said counterattacks. On October 17, 1973, Israeli forces conducted an ambush against Egyptian tank divisions commanded by Ahmad Halalmi Hassan, whose force consisted of 94 Soviet made T-62's and 40 other armored APC's, as they were advancing towards Israeli occupied territories in the Sinai. The Israeli forces consisted of 14 M60 Patton Tanks, they conducted the ambush by creating an "L" formation and attacking from a location in which the Egyptian Tank Brigade had not anticipated a hostile presence. Because the Israeli forces were outnumbered in the battle, they used tactics wherein their tanks peeked out over the hill, fired one shot, then descended to take cover from enemy fire, this process would be repeated by every tank in Avraham's contingent. In the end the Egyptian advance was halted suffering heavy losses, whilst the Israeli forces only withstood the loss of three tanks.

Outcome
In the end the battle was a victory for the Israel Defense Forces, because they had caused heavy losses to the Egyptian Forces and pushed them onto the defensive. This battle is a key turning point in the war.

Sources
 Avraham Adan, On the Banks of the Suez, Presidio Press (Reprint edition), 1991.
 Elyashiv Sunny, All are looking at them: the brigade commanders on the battlefield, Tel Aviv: Ministry of Defense, 2006.
 Elyashiv Sunny, The power to decide: the division commanders on the battlefield, Tel Aviv: Ministry of Defense, 2007.

References

Battles of the Yom Kippur War